In linear algebra, a square matrix  is called diagonalizable or non-defective if it is similar to a diagonal matrix, i.e., if there exists an invertible matrix  and a diagonal matrix  such that  or equivalently  (Such   are not unique.)

Diagonalizable matrices and maps are especially easy for computations, once their eigenvalues and eigenvectors are known. One can raise a diagonal matrix  to a power by simply raising the diagonal entries to that power, and the determinant of a diagonal matrix is simply the product of all diagonal entries; such computations generalize easily to  Geometrically, a diagonalizable matrix is an inhomogeneous dilation (or anisotropic scaling) — it scales the space, as does a homogeneous dilation, but by a different factor along each eigenvector axis, the factor given by the corresponding eigenvalue.

A square matrix that is not diagonalizable is called defective. It can happen that a matrix  with real entries is defective over the real numbers, meaning that  is impossible for any invertible  and diagonal  with real entries, but it is possible with complex entries, so that  is diagonalizable over the complex numbers. For example, this is the case for a generic rotation matrix.  

Many results for diagonalizable matrices hold only over an algebraically closed field (such as the complex numbers). In this case, diagonalizable matrices are dense in the space of all matrices, which means any defective matrix can be deformed into a diagonalizable matrix by a small perturbation; and the Jordan normal form theorem states that any matrix is uniquely the sum of a diagonalizable matrix and a nilpotent matrix. Over an algebraically closed field, diagonalizable matrices are equivalent to semi-simple matrices.

Definition 
A square  matrix, with entries in a field  is called diagonalizable or nondefective if there exists an  invertible matrix (i.e. an element of the general linear group GLn(F)), such that  is a diagonal matrix. Formally,

Characterization 
The fundamental fact about diagonalizable maps and matrices is expressed by the following:

With respect to such a basis,  will be represented by a diagonal matrix. The diagonal entries of this matrix are the eigenvalues of 

The following sufficient (but not necessary) condition is often useful.
 An  matrix  is diagonalizable over the field  if it has  distinct eigenvalues in  i.e. if its characteristic polynomial has  distinct roots in  however, the converse may be false. In this example, the eigenspace of  associated with the eigenvalue 2 has dimension 2.

Let  be a matrix over  If  is diagonalizable, then so is any power of it. Proof: If  is diagonalizable, then  is annihilated by some polynomial  which has no multiple root (since  and is divided by the minimal polynomial of 

Over the complex numbers , almost every matrix is diagonalizable. More precisely: the set of complex  matrices that are not diagonalizable over  considered as a subset of  has Lebesgue measure zero. One can also say that the diagonalizable matrices form a dense subset with respect to the Zariski topology: the non-diagonalizable matrices lie inside the vanishing set of the discriminant of the characteristic polynomial, which is a hypersurface. From that follows also density in the usual (strong) topology given by a norm. The same is not true over 

The Jordan–Chevalley decomposition expresses an operator as the sum of its semisimple (i.e., diagonalizable) part and its nilpotent part. Hence, a matrix is diagonalizable if and only if its nilpotent part is zero. Put in another way, a matrix is diagonalizable if each block in its Jordan form has no nilpotent part; i.e., each "block" is a one-by-one matrix.

Diagonalization 

If a matrix  can be diagonalized, that is,

 

then:

 

Writing  as a block matrix of its column vectors 

the above equation can be rewritten as

The invertibility of  also suggests that the eigenvectors are linearly independent and form a basis of  This is the necessary and sufficient condition for diagonalizability and the canonical approach of diagonalization.

For most practical work matrices are diagonalized numerically using computer software. Many algorithms exist to accomplish this.

Simultaneous diagonalization 

A set of matrices is said to be simultaneously diagonalizable if there exists a single invertible matrix  such that  is a diagonal matrix for every  in the set. The following theorem characterizes simultaneously diagonalizable matrices: A set of diagonalizable matrices commutes if and only if the set is simultaneously diagonalizable.

For instance, the matrices

are diagonalizable but not simultaneously diagonalizable because they do not commute.

A set consists of commuting normal matrices if and only if it is simultaneously diagonalizable by a unitary matrix; that is, there exists a unitary matrix  such that  is diagonal for every  in the set.

In the language of Lie theory, a set of simultaneously diagonalizable matrices generates a toral Lie algebra.

Examples

Diagonalizable matrices 
 Involutions are diagonalizable over the reals (and indeed any field of characteristic not 2), with ±1 on the diagonal.
This follows since the minimal polynomial is separable, because the roots of unity are distinct.
 Projections are diagonalizable, with 0s and 1s on the diagonal.
 Real symmetric matrices are diagonalizable by orthogonal matrices; i.e., given a real symmetric matrix   is diagonal for some orthogonal matrix  More generally, matrices are diagonalizable by unitary matrices if and only if they are normal. In the case of the real symmetric matrix, we see that  so clearly  holds. Examples of normal matrices are real symmetric (or skew-symmetric) matrices (e.g. covariance matrices) and Hermitian matrices (or skew-Hermitian matrices). See spectral theorems for generalizations to infinite-dimensional vector spaces.

Matrices that are not diagonalizable 
In general, a rotation matrix is not diagonalizable over the reals, but all rotation matrices are diagonalizable over the complex field. Even if a matrix is not diagonalizable, it is always possible to "do the best one can", and find a matrix with the same properties consisting of eigenvalues on the leading diagonal, and either ones or zeroes on the superdiagonal – known as Jordan normal form.

Some matrices are not diagonalizable over any field, most notably nonzero nilpotent matrices. This happens more generally if the algebraic and geometric multiplicities of an eigenvalue do not coincide. For instance, consider

This matrix is not diagonalizable: there is no matrix  such that  is a diagonal matrix. Indeed,  has one eigenvalue (namely zero) and this eigenvalue has algebraic multiplicity 2 and geometric multiplicity 1.

Some real matrices are not diagonalizable over the reals. Consider for instance the matrix

The matrix  does not have any real eigenvalues, so there is no real matrix  such that  is a diagonal matrix. However, we can diagonalize  if we allow complex numbers. Indeed, if we take

then  is diagonal. It is easy to find that  is the rotation matrix which rotates counterclockwise by angle 

Note that the above examples show that the sum of diagonalizable matrices need not be diagonalizable.

How to diagonalize a matrix 
Diagonalizing a matrix is the same process as finding its eigenvalues and eigenvectors, in the case that the eigenvectors form a basis. For example, consider the matrix

The roots of the characteristic polynomial  are the eigenvalues  Solving the linear system  gives the eigenvectors  and  while  gives  that is,  for  These vectors form a basis of  so we can assemble them as the column vectors of a change-of-basis matrix  to get:

We may see this equation in terms of transformations:  takes the standard basis to the eigenbasis,  so we have:

so that  has the standard basis as its eigenvectors, which is the defining property of  

Note that there is no preferred order of the eigenvectors in  changing the order of the eigenvectors in  just changes the order of the eigenvalues in the diagonalized form of

Application to matrix functions 
Diagonalization can be used to efficiently compute the powers of a matrix 

 

and the latter is easy to calculate since it only involves the powers of a diagonal matrix. For example, for the matrix  with eigenvalues  in the example above we compute:

 

This approach can be generalized to matrix exponential and other matrix functions that can be defined as power series. For example, defining  we have:
 

This is particularly useful in finding closed form expressions for terms of linear recursive sequences, such as the Fibonacci numbers.

Particular application 
For example, consider the following matrix:

Calculating the various powers of  reveals a  surprising pattern:

The above phenomenon can be explained by diagonalizing   To accomplish this, we need a basis of  consisting of eigenvectors of   One such eigenvector basis is given by

where ei denotes the standard basis of Rn. The reverse change of basis is given by

Straightforward calculations show that

Thus, a and b are the eigenvalues corresponding to u and v, respectively. By linearity of matrix multiplication, we have that

Switching back to the standard basis, we have

The preceding relations, expressed in matrix form, are

thereby explaining the above phenomenon.

Quantum mechanical application 
In quantum mechanical and quantum chemical computations matrix diagonalization is one of the most frequently applied numerical processes. The basic reason is that the time-independent Schrödinger equation is an eigenvalue equation, albeit in most of the physical situations on an infinite dimensional space (a Hilbert space).

A very common approximation is to truncate Hilbert space to finite dimension, after which the  Schrödinger equation can be formulated as an eigenvalue problem of a real symmetric, or complex Hermitian matrix. Formally this approximation is founded on the variational principle, valid for Hamiltonians that are bounded from below.

First-order perturbation theory also leads to matrix eigenvalue problem for degenerate states.

See also 
 Defective matrix
 Scaling (geometry)
 Triangular matrix
 Semisimple operator
 Diagonalizable group
 Jordan normal form
 Weight module – associative algebra generalization
 Orthogonal diagonalization

Notes

References 

Matrices